"Love, in Itself" is Depeche Mode's ninth UK single (released on 19 September 1983), and the final single from the album Construction Time Again. The song peaked at number 21 on the UK Singles Chart.

The "Love, in Itself" single contains three mixes of the song. "Love, in Itself • 2" is the single edit of "Love, in Itself". "Love, in Itself • 3" is the 12″ version. "Love, in Itself • 4" is a Lounge-inspired version of the song that features piano prominently. The B-side is "Fools", which was written by Alan Wilder.

Music video 
The video for "Love, in Itself" was directed by Clive Richardson. It also featured Martin Gore playing acoustic guitar.

Formats and track listings 
These are the formats and track listings of major single releases of "Love, in Itself":

7″: Mute/7Bong4 (UK)
 "Love, in Itself • 2" – 4:00
 "Fools" – 4:14

12″: Mute/12Bong4 (UK)
 "Love, in Itself • 3" – 7:18
 "Fools" (Bigger) – 7:39
 "Love, in Itself • 4" – 4:38

12″: Mute/L12Bong4 (UK)
 "Love, in Itself • 2" (original 7 inch mix) – 4:18
 "Just Can't Get Enough" (live)1 – 5:35
 "A Photograph of You" (live)1 – 3:21
 "Shout!" (live)1 – 4:39
 "Photographic" (live)1 – 3:56

Note: The "original 7 inch mix" is a slightly longer version of "Love, in Itself • 2".

CD: Mute/CDBong4 (UK)2
 "Love, in Itself • 2" – 4:00
 "Fools" – 4:14
 "Love, in Itself • 3" – 7:18
 "Fools" (Bigger) – 7:39
 "Love, in Itself • 4" – 4:38

Notes
1 Live tracks recorded 25 October 1982 at Hammersmith Odeon in London.
2 The CD single was released in 1991 as part of the singles box set compilations.
"Love, in Itself" and "A Photograph of You" were written by Martin Gore.
"Fools" was written by Alan Wilder.
"Just Can't Get Enough", "Photographic", and "Shout!" were written by Vince Clarke.
"Just Can't Get Enough" became a hit of its own in the Netherlands and Belgium in early 1985. It wasn't released as a separate single, so it was the 12″ single (L12Bong4) that entered the Dutch chart. Officially it was not allowed in the singles charts as the 12″ had been sold (and priced) as a mini-LP in the weeks before that. But due to its popularity on the radio, "Just Can't Get Enough (live)" was allowed to enter and duly became Depeche Mode's biggest Dutch hit of all time.

Charts

References

External links 
 "Love, in Itself" information from the official Depeche Mode web site

1983 singles
Depeche Mode songs
Songs written by Martin Gore
Song recordings produced by Daniel Miller
Song recordings produced by Gareth Jones
Mute Records singles
1983 songs